Zirconyl acetate is the coordination complex with the formula Zr6O4(OH)4(O2CCH3)12.  It is a white solid prepared by treating zirconyl chloride with acetic acid.  The compound has attracted attention as a precursor to metal-organic frameworks.  The structure of the 8.5 hydrate has been determined by EXAFS.  The core can be described as a Zr6 octahedron is face-capped with oxide and hydroxide ligands.

References

Zirconium(IV) compounds
Acetates